The Aeolus Yixuan is a compact sedan produced by Dongfeng Motor Corporation under the Aeolus sub-brand.

Overview

Initially previewed by the 2018 Aeolus eπ Concept, the Aeolus Yixuan debuted during the 2019 Shanghai Auto Show as the D53. Yixuan being listed on 9 September 2019 with a price range of 74,900 yuan to 109,900 yuan (~US$10,528 – US$15,448).

The engine options of the Aeolus Yixuan includes a 1.0-litre inline-three petrol turbo engine and a 1.5-litre inline-four petrol turbo engine. The Aeolus Yixuan features a torsion beam type non-independent suspension.

Technical configurations including a Level-2 autonomous driving assistance system is also available on the Aeolus Yixuan, supporting functions such as automatic parking, forward collision warning, automatic brake assistance, adaptive cruising, lane keeping assistance, traffic signal recognition, and intelligent speed limit reminder. The Yixuan will also be equipped with a 7-inch LCD instrument panel and a 10-inch center console display.

Powertrain

Aeolus Yixuan Knight
The Aeolus Yixuan Knight is a sportier variant of the Yixuan sedan inspired by the Yixuan CTCC race car. The Yixuan Knight features a highly personalized sports package kit, a spoiler, and CTCC badges and is available in four vehicle trim levels, the 230T automatic dazzling shining knight, 230T automatic cool shining knight, 230T automatic dazzling knight and 230T automatic cool knight.

Aeolus Yixuan EV
The Yixuan EV, a pure electric compact sedan based on the Yixuan debuted in September 2019. The Yixuan EV is based on Aeolus's electric platform eCMP, and was listed in 2019.

Aeolus Yixuan CTCC racecar
The Aeolus Yixuan CTCC racecar is the racecar Aeolus used for the Chinese Touring Car Championship (CTCC). Just like the production Aeolus Yixuan, the Aeolus Yixuan CTCC racecar adopts the same CMP global modular platform, with the suspension adopting the international leading level adjustment technology.

Aeolus Yixuan Mach Edition
The Yixuan Mach Edition is a special version sold alongside the regular Yixuan. It is sold at a lower price of 64,900 Yuan for the entry manual version and 69,900 Yuan for the entry 6DCT version, compared to 69,900 Yuan for the entry 1.0T manual Yixuan and 77,900 Yuan for the entry 1.5T 6DCT Yixuan.

All versions of the Mach edition are equipped with a weaker DFMC15DR naturally-aspirated 1.5L engine producing  of power at 6000 rpm and 158Nm of torque at 4500 rpm.

References

External links 
 Aeolus Yixuan Official Website

Aeolus Yixuan
Compact cars
Cars introduced in 2019
Front-wheel-drive vehicles
Sedans
Cars of China
Production electric cars